The Telephone Operator is a 1954 West German musical romance film directed by Carl-Heinz Schroth and starring Renate Holm, Georg Thomalla and Fita Benkhoff.

The film's sets were designed by the art director Rolf Zehetbauer.

Cast 
 Renate Holm as Susi Behnke
 Georg Thomalla as Peter Lindner
 Fita Benkhoff as Tante Bruni
 Harry Meyen as Curt Cramer
 Ernst Waldow as Vater Behnke
 Ruth Stephan as Lenchen Miesbach
 Mona Baptiste as Singer
 Bully Buhlan as Bobby
 Die Drei Peheiros as Singers
 Jupp Hussels as Direktor Bartel
 Christine Mylius
 Marina Ried as Lilo Hagen
 Helmuth Rudolph

References

Bibliography 
 Bock, Hans-Michael & Bergfelder, Tim. The Concise CineGraph. Encyclopedia of German Cinema. Berghahn Books, 2009.

External links 
 

1954 films
1950s romantic musical films
German romantic musical films
West German films
1950s German-language films
Films directed by Carl-Heinz Schroth
German black-and-white films
Telephony in popular culture
1950s German films